Jean Parédès (1914–1998) was a French film actor.

Selected filmography

 Three from St Cyr (1939) - Bréval
 The Fatted Calf (1939) - Albert - le garçon de café
 La Charrette fantôme (1939) - Un salutiste (uncredited)
 Night in December (1940) - Un figurant
 Les musiciens du ciel (1940) - (uncredited)
 Premier rendez-vous (1941) - Max de Vatremont
 Who Killed Santa Claus? (1941) - Kappel, le sacristain
 Caprices (1942) - Constant
 La Nuit fantastique (1942) - Cadet
 Signé illisible (1942) - Robert Bigard
 Lettres d'amour (1942) - Désiré Ledru
 The White Truck (1943) - Ernest
 Bonsoir mesdames, bonsoir messieurs (1944) - Zéphyr dit Le Ténor sans Voix
 L'aventure est au coin de la rue (1944) - Paul Roulet
 L'extravagante mission (1945) - Hipplyte Castrito
 La Vie de Bohème (1945) - Le vicomte / Il visconte
 120, rue de la Gare (1946) - Marc Covet
 Trente et quarante (1946) - Monsieur Leprince
 The Village of Wrath (1947) - Mascaret
Coincidences (1947) - Montburon
 Une nuit à Tabarin (1947) - Jean
 Le diamant de cent sous (1948) - Charles
 Cité de l'espérance (1948) - Albaric
 Toute la famille était là (1948) - Victor Catignac
 My Aunt from Honfleur (1949) - Adolphe
 Scandal on the Champs-Élysées (1949) - Étienne
 Mademoiselle de la Ferté (1949) - Barradère
 L'auberge du péché (1949) - Jacques
 Une nuit de noces (1950) - Gaston
 Le trésor des Pieds-Nickelés (1950) - Filochard
 Without Trumpet or Drum (1950) - Le fou
 Le gang des tractions-arrière (1950) - Ernest Michaux
 Et moi j'te dis qu'elle t'a fait d'l'oeil! (1950) - Yves Ploumanach
 Chéri de sa concierge (1951) - Eugène Crochard
 Une fille à croquer (1951) - Fou
 Les deux Monsieur de Madame (1951) - Adolphe Gatouillat
 Fanfan la Tulipe (1952) - Le capitaine de la Houlette
 Women Are Angels (1952) - Philogène
 Adorable Creatures (1952) - The Butler (uncredited)
 Beauties of the Night (1952) - Paul - le pharmacien
 Plaisirs de Paris (1952) - Albert
 Le plus heureux des hommes (1952) - François Lombard
 The Three Musketeers (1953) - Le comte de Wardes
 Légère et court vêtue (1953) - Gaëtan
 The Lady of the Camellias (1953) - Comte Varville
 After You Duchess (1954) - Jeff
 The Air of Paris  (1954) - Jean-Marc
 Madame du Barry (1954) - Lebel
 Cadet Rousselle (1954) - Le général
 French Cancan (1955) - Coudrier
 If Paris Were Told to Us (1956) - Un médecin
 Michel Strogoff (1956) - Alcide Jolivet
 La garçonne (1957) - Edgar Lair
 Love Is at Stake (1957) - De Bérimont
 Filous et compagnie (1957) - Guillaume Donzain
 La Tour, prends garde ! (1958) - Taupin
 Oh! Qué mambo (1959) - Nikita
 The Bureaucrats (1959) - Gorguchon
 Le panier à crabes (1960)
 Girl on the Road (1962) - Le maître d'hôtel
 Du mouron pour les petits oiseaux (1963) - Monsieur Fleurville
 Love Is a Ball (1963) - Freddie
 What's New Pussycat? (1965) - Marcel
 The Double Bed (1965) - L'antiquaire (segment 3 "La répétition")
 Angelique and the King (1966) - Saint-Amon
 Johnny Banco (1967) - L'Anchois
 Astérix et Cléopâtre (1968) - Jules César (voice)
 A Very Curious Girl (1969) - M. Paul, dit La Tisane
 L'homme qui vient de la nuit (1971) - Patrick Tournon
 Papa les petits bateaux... (1971) - Commissaire Duvalier
 Q (1974) - Le premier ministre
 Violette (1978) - Le chanteur de la complaine
 The Lady Banker (1980) - Le directeur de la prison (scenes deleted)
 Engrenage (1980) - Jacques Bhome
 L'émir préfère les blondes (1983) - Le propriétaire du cheval
 Le bourreau des cœurs (1983) - Max
 La femme ivoire (1984) - M. Desplat
 L'angelo custode (1984)
 Chouans! (1988) - le Chapelain

References

Bibliography
 Hayward, Susan. French Costume Drama of the 1950s: Fashioning Politics in Film. Intellect Books, 2010.

External links

1914 births
1998 deaths
French male film actors
French male television actors
People from Rhône (department)